Rhygyfarch or Rhigyfarch (in contemporary late Old Welsh orthography Ricemarch, 1057–1099), eldest son of Sulien, whom he may have succeeded in 1091 as Bishop of St David's, was the author of the standard Life of Saint David. The original text was written in Latin but was translated into Welsh later in the Middle Ages as Buchedd Dewi and did much to enhance the cult status of Saint David in Wales.  He also wrote Latin poems, including one dealing with the different versions of the Psalter, and another called "Planctus Ricemarch" (Rhygyfarch's Lament), bemoaning the state of those parts of south Wales under Norman occupation.

References

Bishops of St Davids
11th-century Welsh poets
Medieval Latin poets
11th-century Latin writers
People from Ceredigion
Welsh biographers
11th-century Welsh bishops
1057 births
1099 deaths
11th-century Welsh writers